1850 in archaeology

Excavations
 First excavations at Uruk by William Kennett Loftus (continues to 1854).

Finds
 Skara Brae revealed by weather.
 Tara Brooch (c.700 AD) found  near Laytown, County Meath, Ireland.
 Neolithic site at Barnenez in Brittany recognised as a tumulus.

Births
 March 18 – Alfred Maudslay, explorer, archaeologist and writer of accounts of the ruins of the Maya civilization (died 1931)
 September 18 – Grigore Tocilescu, Romanian historian, archaeologist, epigrapher and folkorist, author of many books on ancient Dacia (died 1909)

See also
 List of years in archaeology
 1849 in archaeology
 1851 in archaeology

References

Archaeology
Archaeology by year
Archaeology
Archaeology